Acrosport may refer to:

 One of two aerobatic sports aeroplanes, Acro Sport I and Acro Sport II
 A dance sequence from Ovo (Cirque du Soleil)
 A range of athletic or sports activities including:
 Acrobatic gymnastics
 Acrobalance
 Gymnastic formation
 A human pyramid
 A Human tower (gymnastic formation) and similar cultural activities:
 Castell, human towers performed in Catalonia, Spain
 Muixeranga, human towers in the Valencian Community
 Govinda sport, human towers to celebrate the birth of Krishna